Harold Gill Tetley (26 July 1907 – 1 April 1987) was a New Zealand rugby league player and coach who represented New Zealand.

Playing career
Tetley played for the Richmond Rovers in the Auckland Rugby League competition. Tetley represented Auckland City and Auckland Province, captaining Auckland City in 1936. He played for New Zealand in four Test matches between 1935 and 1938. Tetley was made New Zealand captain in 1937 for the second Test match against Australia.

Coaching career
Tetley coached the Kiwis on the 1955-56 tour of Great Britain and France.

References

1907 births
1987 deaths
Auckland rugby league team players
New Zealand national rugby league team captains
New Zealand national rugby league team coaches
New Zealand national rugby league team players
New Zealand rugby league coaches
New Zealand rugby league players
Richmond Bulldogs players
Rugby league locks
Rugby league props
Rugby league second-rows
Ponsonby RFC players